Routliffe is a surname. Notable people with the surname include: 

Erin Routliffe (born 1995), New Zealand tennis player
Tess Routliffe (born 1998), Canadian swimmer